The 1999 Molson Indy Vancouver was a Championship Auto Racing Teams (CART) motor race held on September 5, 1999, at Concord Pacific Place in Vancouver, British Columbia, Canada. It was the 16th round of the 1999 CART season. Juan Pablo Montoya won the race from pole position and led nearly every lap en route to his seventh win of the season, followed by Patrick Carpentier and Jimmy Vasser.

Despite leading all but one lap during the race, Montoya was hampered by the wet racetrack and the pace of his championship rival Dario Franchitti; at one point, both drivers touched on track, spinning Franchitti out and ending his chances at winning the race. The race also saw multiple crashes as drivers struggled to navigate around the soaking wet racetrack.

Qualifying

Race

– Includes two bonus points for leading the most laps and being the fastest qualifier.

Race statistics
Lead changes: 2 among 2 drivers

Standings after the race

Drivers' standings

References

Vancouver Grand Prix, 1999
Indy Vancouver
Molson Indy Vancouver
1999 in British Columbia